Omnes Education, formerly INSEEC U. is a private university in France, with French, European and international campuses in Paris, Bordeaux, Lyon, Chambéry, London, Monaco, Geneva, Abidjan and Shanghai as well as San Francisco.

It encompasses 16 Schools, 10 campuses worldwide, 28,000 students (30% of foreign students), over 100,000 alumni, 345 faculty members, 800 lecturers, 115 majors, 515 partner universities, 1,500 partner companies, 5000 executive education participants (known in French as intervenants) who teach alongside their career.

OMNES Education provides bachelor's degree, Grande Ecole and non-Grande Ecole Master's degrees, MBAs, PhDs and Diploma.

It is a member of the Union of Independent Grandes Écoles and of the Conférence des grandes écoles (CGE) since 2009,

INSEEC Business School, part of OMNES Education is AMBA-accredited since 2017. European Business School Paris, part of OMNES Education is a member of the Association to Advance Collegiate Schools of Business (AACSB).

Omnes is a for-profit organisation owned by private equity firm Cinven.

History 
In 2010, the INSEEC Group purchases the International University of Monaco. INSEEC starts a partnership with Arts et Métiers ParisTech (ENSAM Engineering School).

In 2011, INSEEC starts a tripartite agreement with Tsinghua University, Versailles Saint-Quentin-en-Yvelines University

In 2012, the INSEEC Group buys the Consular Business School of Chambéry (ESC Chambéry) to create INSEEC Alpes Savoie Business School, an additional campus in the Alps. The incubant on-campus students' consulting association: INSEEC Conseil becomes officially Junior Enterprise-accredited, after being bestowed this prestigious label upon by the French National Confederation of Junior Enterprises.

In 2013, Career Education Corporation cedes its shares of the INSEEC Group. Apax Partners and BPI France acquires the INSEEC Group, making INSEEC's shareholders fully French again.

In 2014, CREA Geneva was integrated into the INSEEC group. That year also saw the opening of the Luxury Business Institute (LBI) in Shanghai.

In 2015, the ECE (Ecole de Commerce Européenne): the European School of Business becomes the BBA INSEEC – BBA as for Business Bachelor, a 4-year American Bachelor curriculum. Establishment the same year of a Strategy Cluster in Lyon, specialised in Strategic management.

In 2016, INSEEC was established in San Francisco and acquired the French schools of the Lauréate International Group, (EBS, ESCE, ECE, IFG and the HEIP).
In 2017, the INSEEC Group is renamed INSEEC U.

The Grande Ecole INSEEC Business School becomes INSEEC School of Business and Economics. INSEEC acquires HEIP (Hautes Etudes Internationales et Politiques – part of INSEEC U.), a Higher Education Institute specialised in Political Sciences, Diplomacy and International Relations established since 1899, with campuses in Paris, London and Lyon.

In 2018, HEIP, Hautes Etudes Internationales et Politiques and part of INSEEC U. signs an agreement with McQuarie University in Sydney.

In January 2019, the INSEEC U. was valued at nearly one billion euros. In March 2019, the INSEEC group, was purchased by British investment fund Cinven , for a valuation of around 800 million euros.

On 2 December 2019, INSEEC U. opened a campus of IFG, one of the group's schools, in Ivory Coast.

In 2020, INSEEC U. (INSEEC BS, EBS, ESCE) becomes financially the strongest Business School in France.

In 2021, INSEEC U. rebranded to OMNES Education as part of a €100 million investment into the company over a 5-year period.

Organisation and administration 
INSEEC U. welcomed 22,000 students in 2017 (they were 10,000 in 2010); 8,000 managers and employees in continuing education; more than 80,000 alumni; 370 permanent professors and 150 researchers/professors. There are 4 campuses in France (Paris, Bordeaux, Lyon, Chambéry), 5 campuses abroad (Geneva, Monaco, London, San Francisco, Shanghai) and more than 340 international academic partners, with a global annual budget of €220M in 2017.

OMNES Education proposes a Grande Ecole curriculum in General Management with elective classes available as part of the Grande Ecole Programme and starting from the first year of the Grande Ecole Master's Degree. For more specialised and non-Grande Ecole curricula, INSEEC U. provides master's degrees and MBAs in Wine and Spirits, Digital Media, Real Estate, Health Management, Luxury Management, Sports, Engineering, Journalism and Political Sciences. This incremental strategy has been possible via the numerous acquisitions of the group since its establishment in 1975.

"Grandes Écoles" and Engineering Schools

Other Higher Education Institutes & Schools

Research programmes

University rankings 
Eduniversal, is a university ranking business by the French consulting company and rating agency SMBG specialized in Higher Education. In terms of Dean's recommendation, INSEEC scores from 51 to 84‰ and cumulates "three Eduniversal palms". INSEEC has been thus bestowed the title "Excellent Business School" by Eduniversal.
Deans' recommendation of the INSEEC School of Business and Economics from 2011 until 2019, as part of the Eduniversal ranking done yearly by SMBG, a French consultancy.

INSEEC ranked 7th out of 60 universities in a ranking from Canévet & Associates, a French consultancy. The main criterium of the ranking was the employability of alumni in the top 25 most attractive companies in France.
The Grande Ecole INSEEC School of Business & Economics ranked 7th out of 60 in the ranking: "Best Universities to work in one of the 25 most attractive companies in France."

Notable alumni 
 Michel Landel, CEO of Sodexo until January 2018
 Jacques-Antoine Granjon, French entrepreneur and CEO
 Arthur Sadoun, French businessman, Chairman & CEO Publicis Group since June 2017
 Christophe Blanchet, Politician and Deputy at the French National Assembly
Taha Essou, Famous blogger

See also 

 List of private universities in France

References

External links 
 

Private universities and colleges in France